Patrick Terence William Span Plunket, 7th Baron Plunket,  (8 September 1923 – 28 May 1975), was Equerry to Queen Elizabeth II and Deputy Master of the Household of the Royal Household (1954–1975).

Lord Plunket was born into an old Anglo-Irish aristocratic family on his father's side. His mother, Dorothée Mabel Lewis, was the illegitimate daughter of the actress Fannie Ward and The 7th Marquess of Londonderry. Briefly married to Capt. Jack Barnato, who died during World War I, she married as her second husband the 6th Baron Plunket.

When his parents were killed in an air accident in 1938, Plunket succeeded to the family peerage (created in 1827) as Baron Plunket. He and his brothers were then raised by an aunt, the Hon. Helen Rhodes, and her husband. He was educated at Eton College and joined the Irish Guards.

Lord Plunket was temporary Equerry to King George VI and then to Princess Elizabeth, later Queen Elizabeth II (1948–1954), as a captain. While he was Master of the Household, in 1961, he became a godfather to Viscount Linley (who succeeded as the 2nd Earl of Snowdon in January 2017). On 8 September 1957 he was promoted to major and to lieutenant-colonel 8 April 1969.

Lord Plunket was Trustee of the Wallace Collection and of the National Art Collection Fund.

Plunket was appointed a Member of the Royal Victorian Order (MVO) in the 1955 New Year Honours, a Commander of the Order (CVO) in the 1963 Birthday Honours and a Knight Commander of the Order (KCVO) in the 1974 New Year Honours.

Unmarried, Lord Plunket died of cancer on 28 May 1975. The Queen unusually attended both his funeral at the Chapel Royal and his memorial service at the Guards' Chapel. He is buried in the Royal Burial Ground at Frogmore, the Royal Family's private graveyard in the Home Park near Windsor Castle. The Queen had a memorial built for him in Valley Gardens, Windsor Great Park (a little pavilion with four columns), at the top of the valley (view from pavilion).

References

1923 births
1975 deaths
Barons in the Peerage of the United Kingdom
Eldest sons of British hereditary barons
Knights Commander of the Royal Victorian Order
Commanders Crosses of the Order of Merit of the Federal Republic of Germany
Equerries
People educated at Eton College
Irish Guards officers
Deaths from cancer in the United Kingdom
Burials at the Royal Burial Ground, Frogmore